Pai Kun-hong (born 6 January 1970) is a Taiwanese baseball player who competed in the 1992 Summer Olympics.

He was part of the Chinese Taipei baseball team which won the silver medal. He played as catcher.

External links
profile

1970 births
Living people
Baseball players at the 1992 Summer Olympics
Olympic baseball players of Taiwan
Baseball players from Taipei
Olympic silver medalists for Taiwan
Olympic medalists in baseball

Medalists at the 1992 Summer Olympics